The 66th Street station was an express station on the demolished IRT Ninth Avenue Line in Manhattan, New York City. It had two levels. The lower level was built first and had two tracks and two side platforms. The upper level was built as part of the Dual Contracts and had one track and two side platforms over the lower level local tracks. The station closed on June 11, 1940. The next southbound local stop was 59th Street. The next southbound express stop was 34th Street for Ninth Avenue trains, and 50th Street for IRT Sixth Avenue Line express trains. The next northbound local stop was 72nd Street. The next northbound express stop was 116th Street. The express run from this stop to 116th Street was the longest express segment out of all New York City elevated lines, bypassing seven local stations.

References

External links 
NYCsubway.org - The IRT Ninth Avenue Elevated Line-Polo Grounds Shuttle

IRT Ninth Avenue Line stations
Railway stations closed in 1940
Former elevated and subway stations in Manhattan